Abdullah Awad Al Juhany, is one of the nine Imams of the Grand Mosque Masjid al-Haram in Mecca. He holds a B.A. from the faculty of Qur'an at the Islamic University of Madinah, and a doctorate (Ph.D.) from Umm al-Qura University in Mecca.

Juhany has led the Taraweeh prayers during Ramadan in Mecca since 2005. His voice has been widely recorded and is internationally distributed by various communities.

Career 

He was appointed as an imam of Masjid Al Haram, Mecca in July 2007. He is or has been an imam of Masjid Al Haram in Mecca, Masjid Al Nabawi in Medina, Masjid Quba and Masjid Qiblatain.

See also 
 Saad as-Shuraim
 Abdulrahman As-Sudais
 Saad Al-Ghamdi

Note

References

External links 
 Abdullah Awad al-Juhani Quranicaudio
 Abdullah Awad al-Juhani (Free Download and hear)

Living people
Saudi Arabian imams
Umm al-Qura University alumni
1976 births
Sunni Muslims
Saudi Arabian Muslims
Quran reciters
Imams